KIUL (1240 AM) is a radio station  broadcasting a News Talk Information format. Licensed to Garden City, Kansas, United States, the station serves southwestern Kansas.  The station is currently owned by Steckline Communications and features programming from ESPN Radio, Fox News Radio, Premiere Radio Networks, and Westwood One.

Most of KIUL's programming is simulcast on KYUL, 1310 AM, in Scott City, Kansas. Prior to Steckline's acquisition, the station's call sign was KFLA.

History
In October 1947, the Federal Communications Commission approved the sale of KIUL by Frank D. Conard to The Telegram Publishing Company for $42,000.

References

External links

IUL
News and talk radio stations in the United States